Austin Wormell (born May 26, 1998) is an American soccer player who currently plays for FC Tulsa in the USL Championship.

Career

Youth 
Wormell played high school soccer at Bishop Kelley High School, helping the school to the 2017 Oklahoma Class 5A state championship and earning a spot on the Oklahoma All-State team. He also played club soccer at Tulsa Soccer Club between 2010 and 2016, and Blitz United between 2016 and 2017.

College & Amateur 
In 2017, Wormell attended Creighton University to play college soccer, but redshirted his freshman season for the Bluejays. He transferred to Oregon State University in 2018, but didn't appear for the Beavers. Wormell transferred again to Rogers State University for 2019, and made 15 appearances for the Hillcats, which included a single appearance in 2020 before the season was cancelled due to the COVID-19 pandemic.

In 2018, Wormell played in the NPSL for Tulsa Athletic, making 7 regular season appearances.

Professional 
On March 11, 2021, Wormell signed with USL Championship side FC Tulsa, a team he'd worked for in 2020 for the front office in Community Engagement & Operations. He made his professional debut on June 25, 2021, starting in a 2–1 win over Rio Grande Valley FC.

References

External links 
 Creighton Profile
 Oregon State Profile
 RSU Profile
 FC Tulsa Profile

1998 births
American soccer players
Association football goalkeepers
Creighton Bluejays men's soccer players
FC Tulsa players
Living people
National Premier Soccer League players
Oregon State Beavers men's soccer players
People from Tulsa, Oklahoma
Rogers State Hillcats men's soccer players
Soccer players from Oklahoma
Tulsa Athletic players
USL Championship players